The Drums of Tabu (also known as Fugitivos de las islas del sur and Tabu: le vergini di Samoa) is a 1966 adventure film directed by Javier Setó and produced by Sidney W. Pink. The story follows a drunk who discovers a Samoan princess washed up on the shore of a beach.

The film was distributed in America by Troma Entertainment.

External links

1966 films
Spanish independent films
Troma Entertainment films
1966 adventure films
Italian independent films
Films directed by Javier Setó
Films scored by Gregorio García Segura
Films produced by Sidney W. Pink
1966 independent films